Cafe GoodLuck is a popular Irani cafe-restaurant on the Fergusson College Road, in the Deccan Gymkhana area of Pune, India.
Established in 1935 by Hussain Ali Yakshi, it is one of the oldest Irani places in Pune and was perhaps the first garden restaurant in Pune. Cafe GoodLuck is known for its bun maska/bun omelette and Iranian tea. Cafe GoodLuck has no other branch.

References 

Restaurants in India
Culture of Pune
Restaurants established in 1935
Buildings and structures in Pune